The Summit Lakes are a pair of lakes connected by a short creek in Nipissing District, Ontario, Canada, about  southeast of the community of Temagami. The Ontario Northland Railway mainline crosses the southern tip of the south lake on a trestle.

Hydrology
A short unnamed creek flows from the south side of the north lake to the north side of the south lake; the south lake also has one unnamed creek inflow at the northeast tip. The primary outflow is an unnamed creek, from the south end of the south lake, to Upper Twin Lake, which eventually flows via Rabbit Creek, Rabbit Lake, the Matabitchuan River, Lake Timiskaming, and the Ottawa River into the St. Lawrence River.

See also
Lakes of Temagami

References

Lakes of Temagami
Strathcona Township